James McKay Mair (born May 15, 1946) is a Canadian former professional ice hockey player. He played 76 games in the NHL for the Philadelphia Flyers, New York Islanders, and Vancouver Canucks, and several seasons in the minor Eastern Hockey League and American Hockey League during a career that lasted from 1966 to 1975.

Career statistics

Regular season and playoffs

External links
 

1946 births
Living people
Canadian ice hockey defencemen
Hamilton Red Wings (OHA) players
Johnstown Jets players
New York Islanders players
Philadelphia Flyers players
Quebec Aces (AHL) players
Richmond Robins players
Seattle Totems (CHL) players
Sportspeople from Timmins
Vancouver Canucks players